Hathyar may refer to:

 Hathiar, 1979 film
 Hathyar (1989 film), 1989 film
 Hathyar (2002 film), 2002 film